Sa'yr is a sub-district located in Hubaysh District, Ibb Governorate, Yemen. Sa'yr had a population of 3249 according to the 2004 census.

References 

Sub-districts in Hubaysh District